
Gmina Tarczyn is an urban-rural gmina (administrative district) in Piaseczno County, Masovian Voivodeship, in east-central Poland.

The gmina contains part of the protected area called Chojnów Landscape Park.

Villages
Apart from the town of Tarczyn, Gmina Tarczyn contains the villages and settlements of Borowiec, Brominy, Bystrzanów, Cieśle, Drozdy, Duki, Gąski, Gładków, Grzędy, Grzywiczówka, Janówek, Jeżewice, Jeziorzany, Józefowice, Julianów, Kawęczyn, Kolonia Jeziorzany, Kolonia Świętochów, Komorniki, Komorniki Kolonia, Kopana, Korzeniówka, Kotorydz, Księżak, Księżowola, Leśna Polana, Leśniczówka Mirchów, Many, Marianka, Marylka, Nosy, Nowa Wieś, Nowe Racibory, Pamiątka, Parcele Jeżewice, Pawłowice, Pawłowice Kopana, Popielarze, Prace Duże, Prace Duże-Kolonia, Prace Małe, Przypki, Racibory, Rembertów, Ruda, Skrzeczeniec, Stara Kopana, Stara Wieś, Stefanówka, Suchodół, Suchostruga, Świętochów, Tarnówka, Werdun, Wola Przypkowska-Kolonia, Wólka Jeżewska and Wylezin.

Neighbouring gminas
Gmina Tarczyn is bordered by the gminas of Grójec, Lesznowola, Nadarzyn, Piaseczno, Pniewy, Prażmów and Żabia Wola.

References
Polish official population figures 2006

Tarczyn
Piaseczno County